Clay Township is one of nine townships in Spencer County, Indiana. As of the 2010 census, its population was 2,801 and it contained 1,185 housing units.

History
Clay Township was the last township of Spencer County to be organized, because the rolling hills and relatively poor soil attracted fewer settlers than other areas in the vicinity.

Geography

Cities and towns
Santa Claus

Unincorporated towns
Buffaloville
Clay City
Kennedy
Kercheval
Lamar
Liberal

Places of interest
Lincoln Boyhood National Memorial lies within the township boundaries.

References

External links
 Indiana Township Association
 United Township Association of Indiana

Townships in Spencer County, Indiana
Townships in Indiana